Deh Huleh-ye Sofla (also Romanized as Deh Hūleh-ye Soflá; also known as Darreh Ḩūleh and Hūleh-ye Soflá) is a village in Khaneh Shur Rural District, in the Central District of Salas-e Babajani County, Kermanshah Province, Iran. At the 2006 census, its population was 118, in 25 families.

References 

Populated places in Salas-e Babajani County